The military of New France  consisted of a mix of regular soldiers from the French Army (Carignan-Salières Regiment) and French Navy (Troupes de la marine, later Compagnies Franches de la Marine) supported by small local volunteer militia units (Colonial militia). Most early troops were sent from France, but localization after the growth of the colony meant that, by the 1690s, many were volunteers from the settlers of New France, and by the 1750s most troops were descendants of the original French inhabitants. Additionally, many of the early troops and officers who were born in France remained in the colony after their service ended, contributing to generational service and a military elite. The French built a series of forts from Newfoundland to Louisiana and others captured from the British during the 1600s to the late 1700s. Some were a mix of military posts and trading forts.

Military strategy

The soldiers of New France were either exceptionally well trained and very apt to the challenges of the colonial frontier, or they were dangerously inept.  Most of the military consisted of habitant militia rather than actual French soldiers. Upon their arrival, the soldiers of New France learned quickly that the traditional military techniques seen on the battlefields of Europe were not at all effective in the New World. The Iroquois attacks on the French forced them to adapt to their current situation. Luckily the French were experts on forging alliances with the Native people and with the help from their allies the French adopted what they called "la petite guerre".  This was essentially small-scale guerrilla warfare that allowed the French to harass and cripple targets slowly over time rather than engage in battle after battle, something that New France could not afford. The strategy consisted mostly of stealth and surprise attacks whose purpose lay in creating ambushes and raids, followed by immediate withdrawals from the battlefield. This strategy focused on the elimination of small groups of targets rather than capturing targets of strategic value. This style of warfare was not only well suited to the North American wilderness but it also allowed the French troops to be at a vast numerical disadvantage (outnumbered sometimes 20 to 1) and still effectively retaliate against their enemies, primarily the British.  Ironically, the fact that most of the soldiers were in fact habitant militia men actually aided in the ability to fight using these strategies given that many of these men would have been hunters and would already be accustomed to hunting and stalking in forests.

Indigenous relations

Indigenous allies
It was the job of the military to maintain good relations with frontier Indigenous North Americans in order to preserve French interests in the colony. In fact, preserving a positive relationship between the French and Native Peoples was the most important of the duties that were given to the military. Throughout the years the French developed ties with several Native tribes, those allies consisted mainly of the Abenakis, Algonquin, Huron, Montagnais, and Outaouais and through their partnership they taught the French much more than just military strategy. They taught them how to hunt, fish and dress their catches and they taught them how to navigate and essentially survive in the unforgiving Canadian wilderness. The French soldiers relied heavily on the Native warriors but their allegiance came at a cost. The Natives were "self interested and attached themselves only to the one who gives them the most… and if they failed to be rewarded one single time, the good that was done for them before counts for nothing". In addition, the Natives as tribes provided knowledge of the wilderness but the tribes themselves were not active in their wars as a whole. Native warriors participated in the French battles if they chose to do so usually under the arrangement that they would be compensated for their participation. Falling short on these agreements sometimes caused great discourse amongst the Natives and sometimes damaged French-Native relationships.

Decadence amongst the soldiers

Part of the job of the military was to create good trade relations with the Natives. New France relied heavily on the fur trade given that it was the only valuable commodity in the entire colony, which cost more to operate than it brought in, in profit. However, much of the military hierarchy was not based on merit but rather on internal family connections, which allowed unqualified young ambitious and greedy men to take positions of high rank. This resulted in many soldiers leaving their post for weeks at a time in order to illegally trade with the Natives. The Natives had an understanding of how the trading system worked and considered the military as "trading-goods chiefs" and because of their dereliction of duty came to recognize many soldiers as dishonest people who went against their code. In addition there were even times where the presents the king would send to keep friendly relations with the Natives were often taken and sold to them for profit instead, the only presents they would give them would be mere trinkets. Therefore, the lack of discipline amongst some of the higher ups resulted in losing face amidst the natives and subsequently losing some of their business and their allegiance to the English.

Installations

The French and Canadiens built forts from Newfoundland to Louisiana and others captured from the British from the 1600s to the late 1700s. Some were a mix of military post and trading forts.

 Chateau St. Louis - built 1648 with 16 redoubts; rebuilt and finally destroyed by fire 1834
 Citadelle of Quebec 1673-1872
 The Citadel, Montreal 1690-1821
 Fortress of Louisbourg, Louisbourg, (Ile Royale) Acadie 1720-1758 - destroyed in 1760 and partially rebuilt in the 1960s as a historic museum
 Port Royal, Port Royale, Acadie 1605-1613
 Fort Anne 1636-1713
 Fort Beauharnois 1727-
 Fort Beauséjour 1751-1835
 Fort Boishebert before 1696 to 1751
 Fort Bon Secours 1685-
 Fort Bourbon 1684 (by British); captured 1692 and captured by French several times and returned 1713

 Fort Carillon 1755-1759
 Fort Chambly 1675-1776
 Fort Champlain
 Fort-Coulonge
 Fort Crevier 1687-1701
 Fort Dauphin (Manitoba) 1741-?
Fort de Chartres
 Fort de la Montagne, Mont-Royal 1685 - Quebec and home to Governor; mostly destroyed by fire of 1854
 Fort du Sault Saint-Louis 1725
 Fort Douville 1720-1730
 Fort Duquesne 1754-1758
 Fort Frontenac Fortenac 1673-1758; rebuilt 1783
 Fort Gaspareaux 1751-1756
 Fort Kaministiquia
 Fort La Baye 1717-1760
 Fort La Biche 1753-1757

 Fort La Reine 1738-?
 Fort Le Boeuf 1753-1763
 Fort Lachine (Fort Rémy), Lachine 1672-1873 and site of Lachine massacre; abandoned 1825 and destroyed 1873
 Fort de la Corne 1753-?
 Fort La Jonquière 1751-?
 Fort La Pointe 1693-1759
 Fort Laprairie, Laprairie 1687-1713; site of the Battle of La Prairie 1691
 Fort La Reine 1738-1852
 Fort Le Sueur 1695-
 Fort Machault 1754-1763
 Fort Maurepas 1734-
 Fort Menagoueche 1751-1755
 Fort Miami 1679-1680
 Fort des Miamis 1702-1760
 Fort Michilimackinac 1715-1780
 Fort Michipicoton 1725-1904

 Fort Nashwaak 1692-1700 
 Fort Niagara 1726-   
 Fort Ouiatenon 1717-1791
 Fort Paskoya 1741-
 Fort Pentagouet 1613-1674
 Fort Pimiteoui1691-1812
 Fort Pontchartrain du Détroit 1701-1796
 Fort Presque Isle 1753-1852
 Fort Richelieu 1665-?
 Fort Royal (Plaisance) 1687-1713
 Fort Rouge 1738-1741
 Fort Sainte Anne 1686-1693
 Fort Saint Antoine 1686-1731
 Fort Saint Charles 1732-
 Fort Sainte Croix 1683-
 Fort Saint Jacques 1686-1713
 Fort Saint Jean, La Vallée-du-Richelieu 1666 - destroyed 1760 and rebuilt by British in 1775 and had small shipyard
       
 Fort Saint Joseph 1691-1795
 Fort Saint Nicholas 1685-
 Fort Saint Pierre 1731-1812?
 Fort Sandoské 1747-1763
 Fort Senneville 1671-1691; 1692-1776
 Fort Tourette 1683-1763
 Fort Trempealeau 1685-1731
 Fort Verchères 1672-
 Fort Vincennes 1731-1766
 Fort Ville-Marie 1642-74; demolished 1688

Units

French Army
 Carignan-Salières Regiment (Régiment de Carignan-Salières) - volunteer army unit (1665–1668)
 François Cottineau, dit Champlaurier, a member of this unit and ancestor of PM Sir Wilfrid Laurier
 176 soldiers and 4 officers 1740s
 Canadian Voyageurs - militia unit
 militia artillery corps (2 brigades) - 1723
 Reserve companies (2 units) - 1750s
 The Governor General's Guard 1672-1682 - 20 mounted men-at-arms or carabineers for Comte de Frontenac
 Compagnie des canonniers-bombardiers de Quebec (Gunner and Bombardier Company) 1750-1760 - consisted of 43 gunners/bombers
 Régiment de la Reine 1755-1760
 Régiment de Guyenne 1755-1760
 Régiment de Berry 1755-1760
 Régiment de Béarn 1755-1760
 Régiment La Sarre 1755-1760
 Régiment Royal Roussillon 1755-1760
 Régiment de Languedoc 1755-1760
 Régiment de Bourgogne 1755-1760 
 Régiment d'Artois 1755-1760 - 520 soldiers 
 Régiment de Cambis 1758 - 680 soldiers
 2 companies 
 Marechaussee - police unit
French Navy
 Régiment suisse de Karrer 1722-1745 (Louisbourg); 1747-1749 (Quebec)
 28 Compagnies franches de la Marine of Canada 1683-1755
 30 companies 1750s with 1500 soldiers and 120 officers
 Compagnies franches de la Marine of Acadia
 4 companies with 200 soldiers and 12 officers by 1702
 Compagnies franches de la Marine of Plaisance
 3 companies with 150 soldiers and 9 officers by the 1690s
 Compagnies franches de la Marine on Ile Royale 1710s
 24 companies with 1200 soldiers and 96 officers by 1749
 Bombardiers de la Marine (Navy Bombardiers) 1702-1760s - 108 bombardiers
 Troupes de la marine (Troops of Marines) 1682-1755 - 1759 - 1000 soldiers
 Galley Troops (Pertuisaniers des Galères)
Canadian Militia
 District of Québec: 1759 - 5,640 militiamen
 District of Montréal: 1759 - 5,455 militiamen 4,200 sent to Quebec City
 District of Trois-Rivière: 1759 - 1,300 militiamen 1,100 to Quebec City 
 Canadian Cavalry: 200 cavalrymen
Acadian Militia 1759 - 150 militiamen
Native Indians 1759 - 1,800

Military commanders

 Louis-Joseph de Montcalm
 Chevalier de Lévis
 Louis Antoine de Bougainville
 François-Charles de Bourlamaque
 Claude-Pierre Pécaudy de Contrecœur
 Marquis de Denonville
 Jean-Daniel Dumas
 Daniel Liénard de Beaujeu
 Louis Coulon de Villiers
 Chevalier de la Corne
 Charles Le Moyne
 Joseph-François Hertel de la Fresnière

French Royal Navy

 Jean Vauquelin
 Duc d'Anville
 Joseph de Bauffremont
 Comte de La Galissonière
 Pierre LeMoyne d'Iberville
 Louis Charles du Chaffault de Besné
 Marquis de la Jonquière
 Dubois de la Motte
 Alcide 64-guns 
 L'Algonquin 74-guns
 Bienfaisant 64-guns 
 Bourgogne

 Dauphin Royal 74-guns
 Diadème 74-guns
 Duc de Bourgogne 74-guns
 Fantasque 64-guns 
 Formidable 80-guns 
 Héros 74-guns
 Le Machault 32-guns
 Orient 80-guns 
 Pélican 44-guns 
 Raisonable 64-guns 
 Tonnant 84-guns

Ships built in New France

A list of ships posted to New France:

 La Tempête

Ship building in New France 1650s and repair facilities were available in Quebec and Louisburg.

Ships built in Quebec shipyard include:
 500-tonne store ship launched on June 4, 1742
 Caribou, a 700-tonne store ship launched on May 13, 1744
 Castor, a 26-gun frigate launched on May 16, 1745
 Carcajou, a 12-gun corvette built in 1744-45
 Martre, a 22-gun frigate launched on June 6, 1746
 Saint-Laurent, a 60-gun vessel launched on June 13, 1748
 Original, a 60-gun vessel - sank when launched on September 2, 1750
 Algonquin, a 72-gun ship launched in June 1753
 Abénaquise, a 30-gun frigate launched in the spring of 1756
 30-gun frigate begun in 1756 but not completed

Weapons
 muskets
 light hunting musket by militia units
 flintlock muskets by marines
 matchlock muskets with bayonets by marines
 swords
 pike - used by pikemen
 hatchet - used by militiamen
 halberd

See also

 Canadian Forces
 List of conflicts in Canada
 Provincial Marine
 Canadian militia
 Colonial militia in Canada
Military history of the Mi’kmaq People
Military history of the Acadians

References

New France